Nivalter Santos de Jesus (born September 17, 1987 in Aracajú) is a Brazilian sprint canoer who competed in the late 2000s. At the 2008 Summer Olympics in Beijing, he was eliminated in the semifinals of both the C-1 500 m and the C-1 1000 m events.

References
 Sports-Reference.com profile

1987 births
Brazilian male canoeists
Canoeists at the 2007 Pan American Games
Canoeists at the 2008 Summer Olympics
Canoeists at the 2011 Pan American Games
Living people
Olympic canoeists of Brazil
Pan American Games medalists in canoeing
Pan American Games silver medalists for Brazil
Pan American Games bronze medalists for Brazil
South American Games gold medalists for Brazil
South American Games medalists in canoeing
Competitors at the 2010 South American Games
Medalists at the 2011 Pan American Games
21st-century Brazilian people